Gavan Duffy is a compound surname.  A list of people with the name include:

 C. Gavan Duffy (1874–1958), Canadian politician and judge
 Charles Gavan Duffy (1816–1903), Irish and Australian editor, politician, and jurist
 Charles Leonard Gavan Duffy (1882–1961), Australian judge
 Frank Gavan Duffy (1852–1936), Australian jurist
 George Gavan Duffy (1882–1951), Irish politician and jurist
 Louise Gavan Duffy (1884–1969), Irish nationalist and Irish language enthusiast who founded an Irish language school

See also
 Gavan Duffy (1874–1958), Canadian politician and jurist.
 Gavin Duffy (born 1981), Irish rugby player

References 

Compound surnames
Anglicised Irish-language surnames
Surnames of Irish origin